The Tom and Jerry Deluxe Anniversary Collection is a two-disc DVD set, released by Warner Home Video.

2010 marked the 70th anniversary of the release of the first Tom & Jerry cartoon, Puss Gets the Boot. To mark the occasion, Warner Home Video released a new DVD featuring 30 shorts.

It was released in the UK on the June 1, 2010 and in the US on June 22, 2010.

All of Disc One have been released on previous Tom and Jerry DVDs, especially the three previous Spotlight Collection and the six Classic Collection volumes.

Contents

Disc One 
All Cartoons were previously released on the Tom and Jerry Spotlight Collection, and the Tom and Jerry Classic Collection DVD sets.

1 denotes cartoons in the standard Academy ratio presented in remastered versions, as seen on the spotlight DVDs.
2 denotes cartoons presented edited.
3 denotes Widescreen/CinemaScope cartoons presented cropped to fullscreen.
4 denotes cartoons presented in the CinemaScope aspect ratio using a non-anamorphic letterbox widescreen transfer.
5 denotes cartoons who won an Academy Award.

 Puss Gets the Boot1 
 The Midnight Snack1 
 Dog Trouble1 
 Fraidy Cat1 
 Puss n' Toots1 
 The Lonesome Mouse – re-recorded audio track 
 Yankee Doodle Mouse5 
 Mouse Trouble5 
 Mouse in Manhattan 
 Quiet Please!5 
 The Milky Waif2 
 The Cat Concerto5 
 The Little Orphan2 5 
 Saturday Evening Puss
 The Two Mouseketeers5 
 Johann Mouse5 
 Touché, Pussy Cat!3 
 That's My Mommy3 
 The Egg and Jerry4 
 Tops with Pops4

Bonus Features 
Much ado about Tom and Jerry (an 18-minute documentary about the history of Tom and Jerry)

Trailers (Not on the region 2 version)

Notes 
Gene Deitch's Dicky Moe (1962) is prominently featured on a Disc 1 menu screen, but is not available on the set.

Just as they were on the original release of the Spotlight Collection, Vol. 1, the shorts The Milky Waif and The Little Orphan have been edited to remove scenes where characters are seen in blackface. Likewise, as it had at one time been on Vol. 2, the short The Lonesome Mouse has redubbed dialogue to remove the stereotypical dialect of the African-American maid (Mammy Two Shoes).

Disc Two 
1 denotes cartoons with their opening titles cut.
2 denotes cartoons that are new to DVD.

 Excerpt from Anchors Aweigh (1945)
 Excerpt from Dangerous When Wet (1953)
 Pent-House Mouse (1963, Chuck Jones) (from the UK version of Tom and Jerry: The Chuck Jones Collection)
 The Cat Above The Mouse Below (1964, Chuck Jones) (from the UK version of Tom and Jerry: The Chuck Jones Collection)
 The Cat's Me-Ouch (1965, Chuck Jones) (from the UK version of Tom and Jerry: The Chuck Jones Collection)
 Cosmic Cat and Meteor Mouse (1975, The Tom and Jerry Show, Hanna-Barbera)1 2
 Jerry's Country Cousin (1980; from the TV series The Tom and Jerry Comedy Show, Filmation)1 2
 Flippin' Fido (1990; from the TV series Tom & Jerry Kids Show, Hanna-Barbera/Turner Entertainment) 2
 The Karate Guard (2005, Warner Bros. Animation) 
 A Game of Mouse and Cat (2008; from the TV series Tom and Jerry Tales, Warner Bros. Television Animation)

Notes 
The Mansion Cat (2001) is prominently featured on a Disc 2 menu screen but is not available on the set.

As well as Cosmic Cat and Meteor Mouse, the premiere episode of The Tom and Jerry Show has been released as part of Warner Home Video's Saturday Morning Cartoons – 1970s Volume 2 on October 27, 2009; it marked the first home video release of the 1975 made-for-TV version of Tom and Jerry.

The Chuck Jones cartoons are the unrestored UK Classic Collection prints.

Tom and Jerry